Station is the second full-length album by the instrumental rock band Russian Circles,  and was released on May 6, 2008. This is the band's second release and first with their new label, Suicide Squeeze.

Track listing

Personnel
Russian Circles
 Mike Sullivan − guitar
 Dave Turncrantz − drums
 Brian Cook − bass guitar
 Morgan Henderson − double bass
Technical personnel
 Matt Bayles − production, engineering, mixing, additional keyboards and organ
 Ed Brooks − mastering
 Jonathan Krohn − album design

Charts

External links
SuicideSqueeze.net

Russian Circles albums
Suicide Squeeze Records albums
2008 albums
Albums produced by Matt Bayles